East Wagga Wagga is a suburb of Wagga Wagga, New South Wales. Home Base Wagga Wagga, WIN Television, Country Energy depot, Riverina Water County Council headquarters, Australia Post Mail Sorting Centre, Busabout Wagga Wagga depot, Australian Clay Target Association (ACTA) National Office and ACTA shooting range  are located within East Wagga Wagga.

References

External links 

Suburbs of Wagga Wagga